André-Louis Danjon (6 April 1890 – 21 April 1967) was a French astronomer born in Caen to Louis Dominique Danjon and Marie Justine Binet.

Danjon devised a method to measure "earthshine" on the Moon using a telescope in which a prism split the Moon's image into two identical side-by-side images. By adjusting a diaphragm to dim one of the images until the sunlit portion had the same apparent brightness as the earthlit portion on the unadjusted image, he could quantify the diaphragm adjustment, and thus had a real measurement for the brightness of earthshine. He recorded the measurements using his method (now known as the Danjon scale, on which zero equates to a barely visible Moon) from 1925 until the 1950s.

Among his notable contributions to astronomy was the design of the impersonal (prismatic) astrolabe based on an earlier prismatic astrolabe developed by François Auguste Claude which is now known as the Danjon astrolabe, which led to an improvement in the accuracy of fundamental optical astrometry. An account of this instrument, and of the results of some early years of its operation, are given in Danjon's 1958 George Darwin Lecture to the Royal Astronomical Society.

He also developed the "Danjon limit", a proposed measure of the minimum angular separation between the Sun and the Moon at which a lunar crescent is visible. However, this limit may not exist.

He was Director of the Observatory of Strasbourg from 1930 to 1945 and of the Paris Observatory from 1945 to 1963.

Danjon was the President of the Société astronomique de France (SAF), the French astronomical society, during two periods: 1947–49 and 1962–64.

He was awarded the Prix Jules Janssen of the Société astronomique de France in 1950, and the Gold Medal of the Royal Astronomical Society in 1958.

Danjon died in 1967 in Suresnes, Hauts-de-Seine.

References

20th-century French astronomers
Members of the French Academy of Sciences
Scientists from Caen
Recipients of the Gold Medal of the Royal Astronomical Society
Academic staff of the University of Strasbourg
1890 births
1967 deaths
Presidents of the International Astronomical Union